The 2009–10 Luge World Cup was a multi race tournament over a season for luge. The season started 17 November 2009 in Calgary, Canada and ended 31 January 2010 in Cesana, Italy. The World Cup was organised by the FIL and sponsored by Viessmann. This cup served as qualifiers up to 31 December 2009 (last qualifier at Lillehammer, Norway) for the 2010 Winter Olympics luge events in Vancouver.

Calendar

Results

Men's singles

Doubles

Women's singles

Team relay

Standings

Men's singles

Doubles

Women's singles

Team relay

References

13 October 2009 schedule of 2009-10 Luge World Cup season. - accessed 1 November 2009.

Luge World Cup
2009 in luge
2010 in luge